The 2018 Rugby Africa season contains a series of rugby union tournaments scheduled for 2018 and organised by the governing body of rugby union in Africa, Rugby Africa. The top-tier event is the Rugby Africa Gold Cup – formerly simply known as the Africa Cup – a six-team competition which was played on a round-robin basis from May to August 2018.

Teams 

The following teams will take part in the 2018 Rugby Africa season.

Rankings are taken from the start of each division

Gold Cup

The 2018 edition of the Rugby Africa Gold Cup will be played by the national teams of Namibia, Kenya, Uganda, Morocco, Zimbabwe and Tunisia. The competition will be played in a league format with 15 home or away matches (dependent on their 2017 league position) between the 16th of June and the 18th of August 2018.  Points accumulated for the 2018 edition are as follows:

Victory: 4 points + 1 bonus point for winning by three tries or more.
Draw: 2 points
Loss: 0 point + 1 bonus point for losing by 7 points or less

This year's edition also doubles as qualification for the 2019 Rugby World Cup. The first place team will qualify for the World Cup directly, while the 2nd place team will qualify for the Repechage competition. All others will be eliminated from World Cup contention.

Standings

Standings for the Gold Cup are:

Matches

Silver Cup

Unlike the 2017 edition, the 2018 Silver Cup will be split into two groups of 3 teams each. By beating Zambia 31-0, Algeria won the competition and will automatically join the Gold Cup alongside Zambia.

Group North

Standings

Matches

Group South

Standings

Matches

Final

Bronze Cup

The 2018 Bronze Cup was contested as a single elimination bracket with 4 teams.

Bracket

Matches

Semi-finals

3rd Place Match

Final

References

2018
2018 rugby union tournaments for national teams
2018 in African rugby union